Cedar Swamp Archeological District is a prehistoric and historic archaeologically sensitive area in eastern Westborough, Massachusetts, and extending into the northwest corner of Hopkinton. Archeological surveys of the environmentally sensitive and critical area have identified many Native American sites of interest. It is believed that Native Americans prized wood from the cedar trees that grew in the area. The archeological district, which encompasses much of the Cedar Swamp area, was added to the National Register of Historic Places in 1988.

Description
Parts of this area are traversed by highways (including Interstates 90 and 495), as well as secondary roads.

One archaeological site of note is located on an island in the swamp, which was discovered in 1974 and excavated in 1984-86.  Features of this site include a large refuse midden and a hearth, the latter of which has been radiocarbon dated to about 200 BCE.  Neville and Stark projectile points were also found at this site.  A second site of interest is based around a stone outcrop on the northern edge of the swamp.  This site has extensive evidence of stone tool making, using materials gathered from the outcrop.

The swamp was first examined by amateur archaeologists in 1939, with the first substantive collections of artifacts gathered in the 1960s.  Local and state efforts to investigate sites of interest in the swamp gained traction in the 1970s and 1980s, culminating in the area's National Register designation in 1988.  Finds at sites in the swamp range in age from the Archaic Period to the Late Woodland.

See also
National Register of Historic Places listings in Worcester County, Massachusetts
National Register of Historic Places listings in Middlesex County, Massachusetts

References

National Register of Historic Places in Middlesex County, Massachusetts
Historic districts in Middlesex County, Massachusetts
National Register of Historic Places in Worcester County, Massachusetts
Historic districts in Worcester County, Massachusetts
Historic districts on the National Register of Historic Places in Massachusetts
Archaeological sites on the National Register of Historic Places in Massachusetts
Buildings and structures in Westborough, Massachusetts
Hopkinton, Massachusetts